ITO Joint Venture, or abbreviated "ITO JV" or "ITO", is a joint venture formed by Italian-Thai Development PCL, Takenaka Corporation, and Obayashi Corporation, all leading companies in Thailand and the Japanese building industry. ITO JV as a team was responsible for construction of Suvarnabhumi Airport (BKK), one of the world's largest airports and Thailand's largest airport construction project.

See also 
Suvarnabhumi Airport

External links 
Italian-Thai PCL
Takenaka Corporation
Obayashi Corporation

Construction and civil engineering companies of Thailand